Dаvrоn Fаyziеv (born 14 January 1976 in Samarkand, Uzbekistan), is a retired Uzbek professional footballer and coach.

Career
Fаyziеv played in position of defender and midfielder. He played for many Uzbek and Russian Premier League clubs such CSKA Moscow and Alania Vladikavkaz.

International
He made his debut in the national team on 29 September 1997 in 1998 FIFA World Cup qualifying match against Cambodia won by Uzbekistan with 4-1. He played 26 matches for national team between 1997 and 2007, scoring 2 goals.

Managing career
In 2011 Fаyziеv finished his playing career and started managing career in Sogdiana Jizzakh. In 2012, he finished 1st with Sogdiana in First League and  gained promotion to Uzbek League.

References

External links

1976 births
Living people
People from Samarkand
Uzbekistani footballers
Uzbekistani expatriate footballers
Uzbekistan international footballers
PFC CSKA Moscow players
FC Spartak Vladikavkaz players
Navbahor Namangan players
Russian Premier League players
FK Dinamo Samarqand players
Association football midfielders
Expatriate footballers in Russia
Uzbekistani expatriate sportspeople in Russia